The Mermaid is a ballad, catalogued as Child Ballad #289, Roud 124. Dating to around the mid-18th century, this song is known by a number of names, including Waves on the Sea, The Stormy Winds and The Wrecked Ship.

The song belongs in the category of sea ballads, being a song sailors sung during their time off and not while they worked, but is more commonly thought of as a sea shanty.  It is well known in American folk tradition, and the text has appeared in many forms in both print and oral mediums. The ballad remains part of American culture as a song sung at camps operated by the Boy Scouts of America as well as in public school music education classes.

Synopsis
The ballad describes a ship that left port, its misadventure and eventual sinking. The moral of the song is that mermaids are a sign of an impending shipwreck. It is sung from the point of view of a member of the ship's crew, although the ship sinks without any survivors. In most versions the ship is unnamed but in a version sung by Almeda Riddle, the mermaid disappears and the ship is identified as the Merrymac. Often the ship is said to be departing on a Friday morning, but there are other versions of the lyrics including one that has it leaving on a Saturday night. On the way out to sea, the captain sees a mermaid with a "comb and a glass in her hand".

Three parallel stanzas most often follow describing how three of the crew members, contemplating impending disaster, would rather be somewhere else than on the ocean floor; for example, the cook would rather be with his pots and pans. In English versions crew members often identify their home port and the people (parents, wives, children) who will mourn for them.

The home of the crew members varies from version to version, but it has been assigned to almost every port town in Britain and the East Coast of the United States.  At the end of the ballad the ship turns around three times and sinks with all hands; there are no survivors.

Between each of the verses there oftentimes is a chorus describing the conditions sailors face in a storm and the state of the sea that was caused by the mermaid.

Legacy

The philologist and fantasy author J. R. R. Tolkien wrote a song in Old English, to be sung to the tune of The Mermaid.

See also
 List of the Child Ballads

Notes

References and bibliography

External links
Lyrics: The Mermaid
Alternate Version of the Lyrics: The Mermaid

18th-century ballads
Child Ballads
Fictional mermen and mermaids
Year of song unknown